Brockton is a town in Roosevelt County, Montana, United States. The population was 358 at the 2020 census.

Brockton's first post office was established in 1904. Fort Peck Indian Reservation was opened to non-Native settlers in 1913 and the town boomed. It was incorporated in 1952.

Geography
Brockton is located at  (48.149531, -104.916383).

Demographics

2010 census
As of the census of 2010, there were 255 people, 70 households, and 61 families residing in the town. The racial makeup of the town was 3.9% White and 96.1% Native American. Hispanic or Latino of any race were 1.2% of the population.

There were 70 households, of which 65.7% had children under the age of 18 living with them, 28.6% were married couples living together, 42.9% had a female householder with no husband present, 15.7% had a male householder with no wife present, and 12.9% were non-families. 11.4% of all households were made up of individuals, and 2.9% had someone living alone who was 65 years of age or older. The average household size was 3.64 and the average family size was 3.84.

The median age in the town was 22.4 years. 39.2% of residents were under the age of 18; 15.7% were between the ages of 18 and 24; 18.4% were from 25 to 44; 20.4% were from 45 to 64; and 6.3% were 65 years of age or older. The gender makeup of the town was 49.0% male and 51.0% female.

2000 census
As of the census of 2000, there were 245 people, 67 households, and 59 families residing in the town. The population density was 1,285.7 people per square mile (497.9/km2). There were 72 housing units at an average density of 377.8 per square mile (146.3/km2). The racial makeup of the town was 13.06% White, 84.90% Native American, 0.41% Pacific Islander, and 1.63% from two or more races. Hispanic or Latino of any race were 1.22% of the population.

There were 67 households, out of which 47.8% had children under the age of 18 living with them, 37.3% were married couples living together, 37.3% had a female householder with no husband present, and 11.9% were non-families. 9.0% of all households were made up of individuals, and 1.5% had someone living alone who was 65 years of age or older. The average household size was 3.66 and the average family size was 3.85.

In the town, the population was spread out, with 42.0% under the age of 18, 7.8% from 18 to 24, 25.3% from 25 to 44, 19.2% from 45 to 64, and 5.7% who were 65 years of age or older. The median age was 25 years. For every 100 females, there were 91.4 males. For every 100 females age 18 and over, there were 94.5 males.

The median income for a household in the town was $19,167, and the median income for a family was $19,167. Males had a median income of $30,625 versus $25,625 for females. The per capita income for the town was $8,231. About 43.5% of families and 50.8% of the population were below the poverty line, including 53.3% of those under the age of eighteen and 85.7% of those 65 or over.

Education
Brockton School District educates students from kindergarten through 12th grade. The team name for Brockton High School is the Warriors.

References

External links
 Brockton school district

Towns in Roosevelt County, Montana
Montana populated places on the Missouri River
Fort Peck Assiniboine and Sioux Tribes